{{safesubst:#invoke:RfD||2=Warrington Gillette|month = February
|day = 21
|year = 2023
|time = 03:58
|timestamp = 20230221035839

|content=
REDIRECT Friday the 13th Part 2

}}